Zion's Hill, also known by its former name Hell's Gate, is a town on the Dutch Caribbean island of Saba.

History
Hell's Gate was officially named "Zion's Hill" after complaints from the church forced the island's government to change the name. However, "Hell's Gate" is still commonly used by many Sabans and tourists.

Main sights

Overview
Hell's Gate is home to the Queen of The Holy Rosary Church, a stone structure built in 1962, as well as a community center where visitors can purchase locally made Saba lace and Saba spice, a locally brewed rum drink.

Hell's Gate
Lower Hell's Gate is home to a now-closed sulfur mine where visitors may explore with caution. Hell's Gate is also the start to the Crispin trail. The trail takes roughly 2 hours to complete and has views of Diamond Rock and the Saban coastline.

Transport
It is the first town one reaches after leaving the Juancho E. Yrausquin Airport, the smallest commercial airport in the world.

See also
Mount Scenery

References

External links

Populated places in Saba